Pellenes is a genus of jumping spiders that was first described by Eugène Louis Simon in 1876. It is considered a senior synonym of Hyllothyene.

They are dark to black with white stripes on the back, and often have bright red markings. Most species have a special propensity for snail shells. Pellenes seriatus and P. lapponicus males look very similar to Hasarius adansoni when viewed from the front.

Species
 it contains eighty-three species and one subspecies, found in North America, Africa, Europe, Asia, Australia, and on Saint Helena:
P. aethiopicus Strand, 1906 – Ethiopia
P. albopilosus (Tyschchenko, 1965) – Russia, Kazakhstan
P. allegrii Caporiacco, 1935 – Ukraine, Russia (Europe) to Central Asia
P. amazonka Logunov, Marusik & Rakov, 1999 – Central Asia
P. apacheus Lowrie & Gertsch, 1955 – USA
P. arciger (Walckenaer, 1837) – Southern Europe, Armenia
P. badkhyzicus Logunov, Marusik & Rakov, 1999 – Turkmenistan
P. beani Peckham & Peckham, 1903 – South Africa
P. bitaeniata (Keyserling, 1882) – Australia (Western Australia, Queensland, New South Wales)
P. bonus Logunov, Marusik & Rakov, 1999 – Ukraine (Crimea), Azerbaijan, Iran, Turkmenistan
P. borisi Logunov, Marusik & Rakov, 1999 – Kazakhstan
P. brevis (Simon, 1868) – Portugal, Spain, France, Italy, Germany, Bulgaria, Macedonia, Greece, Ukraine, Turkey, Cyprus, Iran
P. bulawayoensis Wesolowska, 2000 – Zimbabwe, South Africa, Lesotho
P. canadensis Maddison, 2017 – Canada, USA
P. canosus Simon, 1937 – France
P. cinctipes (Banks, 1898) – Mexico
P. cingulatus Wesolowska & Russell-Smith, 2000 – Tanzania
P. corticolens Chamberlin, 1924 – Mexico
P. crandalli Lowrie & Gertsch, 1955 – USA
P. dahli Lessert, 1915 – Uganda, Kenya
P. denisi Schenkel, 1963 – Tajikistan, China
P. diagonalis (Simon, 1868) – Macedonia, Greece, Turkey, Israel, Iran
P. dilutus Logunov, 1995 – Central Asia
P. durioei (Lucas, 1846) – Algeria
P. dyali Roewer, 1951 – Pakistan
P. epularis (O. Pickard-Cambridge, 1872) – Greece to China, Namibia, South Africa
P. flavipalpis (Lucas, 1853) – Greece (incl. Crete), Turkey, Cyprus
P. frischi (Audouin, 1826) – Egypt
P. geniculatus (Simon, 1868) – Southern Europe, Africa, Turkey, Ukraine, Caucasus, Middle East, Iran, Kazakhstan, Central Asia
Pellenes g. subsultans (Simon, 1868) – France
P. gerensis Hu, 2001 – China
P. gobiensis Schenkel, 1936 – Russia, Mongolia, China
P. grammaticus Chamberlin, 1925 – USA
P. hadaensis Prószyński, 1993 – Saudi Arabia
P. hedjazensis Prószyński, 1993 – Saudi Arabia, United Arab Emirates
P. himalaya Caleb, Sajan & Kumar, 2018 – India
P. iforhasorum Berland & Millot, 1941 – Sudan, Mali
P. ignifrons (Grube, 1861) – USA, Canada, Russia, Kazakhstan, China, Mongolia
P. inexcultus (O. Pickard-Cambridge, 1873) – St. Helena
P. iva Caleb, 2018 – India
P. karakumensis Logunov, Marusik & Rakov, 1999 – Turkmenistan
P. laevigatus (Simon, 1868) – Greece (Corfu), Lebanon
P. lagrecai Cantarella & Alicata, 2002 – Italy
P. lapponicus (Sundevall, 1833) – North America, Alpine and Northern Europe, Russia (European to Far East)
P. levaillanti (Lucas, 1846) – Algeria
P. levii Lowrie & Gertsch, 1955 – USA
P. limatus Peckham & Peckham, 1901 – USA
P. limbatus Kulczyński, 1895 – Russia, Central Asia, Mongolia, China
P. logunovi Marusik, Hippa & Koponen, 1996 – Russia
P. longimanus Emerton, 1913 – USA
P. lucidus Logunov & Zamanpoore, 2005 – Afghanistan
P. luculentus Wesolowska & van Harten, 2007 – Yemen
P. maderianus Kulczyński, 1905 – Madeira, Israel
P. marionis (Schmidt & Krause, 1994) – Cape Verde Is.
P. mimicus Strand, 1906 – Ethiopia
P. minimus (Caporiacco, 1933) – Libya
P. modicus Wesolowska & Russell-Smith, 2000 – Tanzania, South Africa
P. moreanus Metzner, 1999 – Macedonia, Greece, Turkey
P. negevensis Prószyński, 2000 – Israel
P. nigrociliatus (Simon, 1875) – Canary Is., Europe, Turkey, Israel, Caucasus, Russia to Central Asia, China
P. obliquostriatus Caporiacco, 1940 – Ethiopia
P. obvolutus Dawidowicz & Wesolowska, 2016 – Kenya
P. pamiricus Logunov, Marusik & Rakov, 1999 – Tajikistan
P. peninsularis Emerton, 1925 – Canada, USA
P. perexcultus Clark & Benoit, 1977 – St. Helena
P. pseudobrevis Logunov, Marusik & Rakov, 1999 – Central Asia
P. pulcher Logunov, 1995 – Russia, Kazakhstan, Mongolia
P. purcelli Lessert, 1915 – Uganda
P. rufoclypeatus Peckham & Peckham, 1903 – South Africa
P. seriatus (Thorell, 1875) – France, Greece, Macedonia, Bulgaria, Romania, Ukraine, Turkey, Caucasus, Russia (Europe to Middle Siberia), Kazakhstan, Central Asia
P. shoshonensis Gertsch, 1934 – USA
P. sibiricus Logunov & Marusik, 1994 – Russia, Central Asia, Mongolia, China
P. siculus Alicata & Cantarella, 2000 – Italy (Sicily)
P. stepposus (Logunov, 1991) – Russia, Kazakhstan
P. striolatus Wesolowska & van Harten, 2002 – Yemen (Socotra)
P. sytchevskayae Logunov, Marusik & Rakov, 1999 – Uzbekistan, Turkmenistan
P. tharinae Wesolowska, 2006 – Namibia, Zimbabwe, South Africa
P. tocharistanus Andreeva, 1976 – Central Asia
P. tripunctatus (Walckenaer, 1802) (type) – Europe, Caucasus, Russia to Central Asia, China
P. turkmenicus Logunov, Marusik & Rakov, 1999 – Russia, Central Asia
P. unipunctus Saito, 1937 – China
P. univittatus (Caporiacco, 1939) – Ethiopia
P. vanharteni Wesolowska, 1998 – Cape Verde Is.
P. washonus Lowrie & Gertsch, 1955 – USA

References

External links
 Photograph of P. brevis
 Photograph of P. tripunctatus
 Photographs of P. seriatus, P. arciger, P. nigrociliatus and P. tripunctatus

Cosmopolitan spiders
Salticidae
Salticidae genera